Paineville is a rural unincorporated community in western Amelia County in the U.S. state of Virginia. It is located around the intersections of SR 616 (S. Genito Road) with SR 644 (Fowlkes Bridge Road / Rocky Ford Road). Paineville straddles the border of ZIP codes 23002 (Amelia Court House) and 23083 (Jetersville). The community has its own fire station, Amelia County Volunteer Fire Department Company 5.

Paineville was among the first towns in Amelia to get its own post office; as early as 1803, a "Painville" in Amelia County was on the official "List of Post-Offices in the United States" published by the Post Office Department. The branch there has since closed.

On April 5, 1865, during the final days of the Civil War, as General Robert E. Lee and his army continued their westward retreat, Union troops attacked and destroyed a Confederate wagon train near Paineville (often called "Painesville" in period sources). The engagement was one of the few, if not the only one, to involve Black Confederate troops. The surrender to Ulysses S. Grant took place at Appomattox on April 9, 1865.

In the 1960s, the property of historical Paineville School, on Route 616, was put up for auction along with several other small schoolhouses in Amelia County.

References

Unincorporated communities in Amelia County, Virginia